Eight Mile Road is a follow up album to Prism (1975) recorded by Ryo Kawasaki for East Wind Records. At the time of this recording, he was working and touring with Elvin Jones Jazz Machine and the first two tracks of this album were conceived during the tour with this band. Track one, "Eight Mile Road", was written while visiting Jones' home town Detroit performing at Baker's Keyboard Lounge, while track two, "Montevideo", was written while visiting and performing with Elvin Jones in the capital of Uruguay.

In addition to the same rhythm section from Prism, Kawasaki has invited saxophonist Sam Morrison (who was the last saxophonist with Miles Davis band until Davis' retirement during 1975) and pianist Andy Laverne (from Stan Getz's band at that time) to add jazzy acoustic flavor over his jazz funk-oriented compositions and electric sound.

This album was recorded at Electric Lady Studios built by Jimi Hendrix, and also won the best recording of the year by Japanese Jazz magazine Swing Journal in 1976.

All songs composed and arranged by Ryo Kawasaki

Track listing
 Eight Mile Road (Ryo Kawasaki) Ryka Music (BMI) 8:31
 Montevideo (Ryo Kawasaki) Ryka Music (BMI) 7:08
 Good Night John (Ryo Kawasaki) Ryka Music (BMI) 5:27
 On The Dot (Ryo Kawasaki) Ryka Music (BMI) 10:20
 El Diablo (Ryo Kawasaki) Ryka Music (BMI) 8:55

Recorded at Electric Lady Studios in New York City

Personnel
Ryo Kawasaki - electric guitar
Sam Morrison - Tenor Saxophone, Soprano Saxophone on Track 1,2,4 & 5
Andy Laverne - Piano, Fender Rhodes, Clavinet Hohner, Synthesizer Arp String Ensemble
Phil Clendeninn - Synthesizer ARP Odyssey on Track 1, 4 & 5
Herb Bushler - electric bass
Buddy Williams - drums
Abdulah - Congas Percussion on Track 1,2,4 & 5
David Baker - Recording and Mixing Engineer

References

External links
Discogs

1976 albums
East Wind Records albums
Albums recorded at Electric Lady Studios